According to the official data, the Muslim population of Suriname represents about 13.9 percent of the country's total population as of 2012, which is the highest percentage of Muslims in the Americas. Though the majority belong to the Sunni sect of Islam, there are some Shi'a, and Sufi Muslims.
 
Some speculate that Muslims first came to Suriname as slaves from West Africa and then were converted to Christianity over time, even though there is little proof for these speculations. The ancestors of the actual Muslim population came to the country as indentured laborers from South Asia and Indonesia, from whom today most Muslims in Suriname are descended.

Because Islam came to Suriname with immigrants from Indonesia (Java) and South Asia (today India, Pakistan and Bangladesh), who brought their local form of Islam to Suriname, it is strongly influenced by these regions. Apart from descent, most Surinamese Muslims also share the same culture and speak the same languages. Suriname has a small number of Afghan Muslims and their native-born children.

Demographics 

There are 75,053 Muslims in Suriname, according to the 2012 census. This number is up from 66,307 Muslims in 2004. However, the share of Muslims declined from 19.6% to 13.9% in the last half-century. The main reason for the declining share of Muslims in Suriname is the mass conversion of Ahmadi to Christianity in the last years. Between 1971 and 2012 the share of
Christianity among ethnic Javanese people grew from 9% to 21% (+12%), while that of Javanese Muslims decreased from 85% to 67% (-18%). The share of Muslims of Indo-Surinamese descent decreased from 17% to 13% in the same period (-4%), mainly because of emigration to the Netherlands and declining fertility rates. The share of Muslims among Maroon people doubled from 0.1% to 0.2%.

Ethnic groups 
Islam is the main religion among Javanese Surinamese people (67%) and the second largest religion among Indo-Surinamese people (13%) and multiracial people (8%).

Geographical distribution 

Commewijne District has the highest share of Muslims (mostly Javanese Surinamese), followed by Nickerie District and Wanica District (mostly Indo-Surinamese).

International
Suriname (since 1996) and Guyana (since 1998) are the only countries in the Americas which are member states of the Organisation of Islamic Cooperation.

Notable Muslims
 Rashied Doekhi, politician
 Paul Somohardjo, politician

See also
Religion in Suriname

References

7. https://abdurrahman.org/2014/01/15/mirza-ghulam-ahmad-and-the-qadiyani-sect/

Further reading
 

 
Suriname